Neuron is a biweekly peer-reviewed scientific journal published by Cell Press, and imprint of Elsevier. It was established in 1988, and covers neuroscience and related biological processes.

The current editor in chief is Mariela Zirlinger. The founding editors were Lily Jan, A. James Hudspeth, Louis Reichardt, Roger Nicoll, and Zach Hall.  A past Editor in Chief was Katja Brose.

References

External links 

 

Neuroscience journals
Cell Press academic journals
Publications established in 1988
English-language journals
Biweekly journals